Kamilla Lilhammer Karlsen (born 7 May 2000) is a Danish footballer who plays as a midfielder for Djurgården in the Damallsvenskan and has appeared for the Denmark women's national under-23 team.

Career
She has also played for the Danish youth national teams, several times. She has received praise for her leadership qualities and is often captain.

She has previously played for Ballerup-Skovlunde Fodbold, from 2016 to 2017. In 2017, she signed for Brøndby IF.

Honours

Club
Brøndby IF
 Elitedivisionen
 Winner: 2019
 Runners-up: 2018
 Danish Cup
 Winner: 2018
 Runners-up: 2019

References

External links
 
 
Profile at Danish Football Association 

2000 births
Living people
Danish women's footballers
Women's association football midfielders
Brøndby IF (women) players
Ballerup-Skovlunde Fodbold (women) players
Denmark women's international footballers
Danish expatriate women's footballers
Danish expatriate sportspeople in France
Expatriate women's footballers in France
FC Fleury 91 (women) players
People from Allerød Municipality
Sportspeople from the Capital Region of Denmark